Hong Yo-seob is a South Korean actor.

Filmography

Television series

Film

Awards and nominations

References

External links 
 Hong Yo-seob Fan Cafe at Daum 
 
 

Living people
South Korean male television actors
South Korean male film actors
Chung-Ang University alumni
People from Seoul
Year of birth missing (living people)